Anthony Julian Huxley (2 December 1920 – 26 December 1992) was a British botanist. He edited Amateur Gardening from 1967 to 1971, and was vice-president of the Royal Horticultural Society in 1991.

He was the son of Julian Huxley. He was educated at Dauntsey's School and Trinity College, Cambridge.

Bibliography 
 Indoor plants. Collingridge, 1957
 Anthony Huxley, Oleg Polunin: Flowers of the Mediterranean. 1965
 Blumen am Mittelmeer. Ein Bestimmungsbuch. 1981, 
 Standard Encyclopedia of the World's Mountains. 1968
 Gebirgsflora in Farben. 1275 Pflanzen der Gebirge Europas. 1969
 Garden Perennials and Water Plants. Littlehampton Book Services Ltd, 1971, 
 Standard encyclopedia of the world's oceans and islands. 1971
 Garden Terms Simplified. David & Charles, 1971, 
 Kew's new country extension: Wakehurst Place, Sussex. 1972
 Flowers in Greece: an outline of flora. 1972
 House Plants, Cacti and Succulents. Littlehampton Book Services Ltd, 1972, 
 Plant and Planet. 1975, 
 Das phantastische Leben der Pflanzen. 1977
 Garden planning and planting. 1976
 Alyson Huxley, Anthony Huxley: Huxley's house of plants. Paddington Press, 1978,  
 Anthony Huxley, William Taylor: Flowers of Greece and the Aegean. 1977
 An illustrated history of gardening. Paddington Press, New York, London, 1978 
 Success with house plants. Reader's Digest Association, 1979, 
 Anthony Huxley, Paul Davies, Jenne Davies: Wild Orchids of Britain and Europe. 1983, 
 Green Inheritance: Saving the Plants of the World. 1984, 
 Unser grünes Erbe. Die Bedeutung der Pflanzen für das Leben auf der Erde. 1985
 Painted Garden. Windward, 1988,

References 

British botanists
1920 births
1992 deaths
People educated at Dauntsey's School
Alumni of Trinity College, Cambridge
Anthony